The 2017–18 Alabama A&M Bulldogs basketball team represented Alabama A&M University during the 2017–18 NCAA Division I men's basketball season. The Bulldogs, led by first-year head coach Donnie Marsh, played their home games at the Elmore Gymnasium in Normal, Alabama as members of the Southwestern Athletic Conference. The Bulldogs finished the season 3–28, 3–15 in SWAC play to finish in last place. Alabama A&M was ineligible for postseason play due to APR violations.

On May 11, 2018, Donnie Marsh resigned after just one season as head coach. Six days later, A&M associate head coach Dylan Howard was named interim head coach of the team for the 2018–19 season.

Previous season
The Bulldogs finished the 2016–17 season 2–27, 2–16 in SWAC play to finish in last place. They did not qualify for the SWAC tournament.

On March 7, head coach Willie Hayes resigned. He finished at Alabama A&M with a six year record of 54–121. On April 12, the school named Texas Southern assistant and former Florida International head coach Donnie Marsh the new head coach.

Roster

Schedule and results

|-
!colspan=9 style=|Non-conference regular season

|-
!colspan=9 style=| SWAC regular season

References

Alabama A&M Bulldogs basketball seasons
Alabama AandM